Hugh Carson Cutler (8 September 1912, Milwaukee, Wisconsin – 12 September 1998, Topeka, Kansas) was a plant taxonomist, economic botanist, plant collector, and pioneer of paleoethnobotany.

Biography
Cutler graduated from the University of Wisconsin–Madison with B.A. in 1935 and M.A. in 1936 and from Washington University in St. Louis with Ph.D. in 1939. His doctoral dissertation was "Monograph of the North American species of the genus Ephedra" . After completing his Ph.D. in 1939 he floated the San Juan River (Colorado River tributary) by himself from Bluff, Utah, to Mexican Hat, Utah. In 1940, Cutler and Martin Withers boated the San Juan from Shiprock, New Mexico, to Aneth, Utah. Cutler met Norman Nevills who hired Cutler to row a boat on one of the early commercial river-running trips down the Colorado River from Green River, Wyoming to Lake Mead through the Grand Canyon. Cutler worked on the boats for two weeks before the start. Due to faulty planning, oars for Cutler's boat did not arrive and a frail 8-foot pair was borrowed and soon broken. Cutler improvised with poles on which were nailed box ends. These worked for the run through Lodore Canyon at Dinosaur National Monument. At Jensen, Utah, supplementary equipment was salvaged from driftwood piles. Barry Goldwater was a trip participant and the two became lifelong friends. The trip took 60-days and near the end of the trip Cutler and Goldwater tobogganed the rapid at Diamond Creek (Arizona) aided by air mattresses. The people who watched from shore raised the question whether the men rode the mattresses or the mattresses rode them. Cutler was listed by Otis R. Marston as the 71st person to travel by boat from Lee's Ferry, Arizona, through Grand Canyon to Lake Mead.

On 26 August 1940 Cutler married Marian W. Cornell (1917–2015). In 1940 Hugh and Marian Cutler collected wild varieties of Tripsacum and cultivated maize (including archaeological samples) in the southwestern United States, Mexico, and Guatemala. From 1941 to 1947 he was a research associate at Harvard Botanical Museum. He held Guggenheim Fellowships for the academic years 1942–1943 and 1946–1947. From 1941 to 1946 Hugh and Marian Cutler collected botanical specimens in Peru, Bolivia, and Brazil. With the distinguished botanist Martín Cárdenas, he wrote the first study on the races of maize in Bolivia. Influenced by Cárdenas, Cutler studied the food production and preparation methods used by the Aymara and Quechua Indians of the Cochabamba Valley and the Lake Titicaca basin. From 1943 to 1945 he was on leave on absence from Harvard University and did his war service working for the Rubber Development Corporation under the auspices of the Board of Economic Warfare. He flew in blimps over northern Brazil and identified wild rubber trees that could be harvested by ground parties.

In 1953 Cutler resigned from the Field Museum of Natural History and that same year became Curator of Economic Botany at the Missouri Botanical Garden. Cutler was back on the Colorado River the next year after befriending river runner Otis Marston. Culter joined Marston and others on 1954, 1956, and 1957 Grand Canyon river runs. On the 1956 river trip, the twin outboard motorboat Cutler was riding in flipped in Lava Falls Rapid, the first record of a boat flip at that rapid. On the 1957 river trip, the Colorado River in Grand Canyon peaked at 124,000 cubic feet per second, the highest flow ever recorded that was run by river runners in Grand Canyon. On all these river trips, Cutler collected plant specimens. He retired from the Missouri Botanical Garden in 1977.

Hugh and Marian Cutler's son William Cornell Cutler was born in 1946.

Selected publications

See also
Cucurbita ecuadorensis

References

20th-century American botanists
University of Wisconsin–Madison alumni
Washington University in St. Louis alumni
Plant collectors
1912 births
1998 deaths
Writers from Milwaukee
Scientists from Milwaukee